Reiley is a surname. Notable people with the surname include:

Amy Reiley, American aphrodisiac foods authority and author
John Reiley Guthrie (1921–2009), United States Army four-star general
Mame Reiley (1952–2014), president of The Reiley Group, a consulting, fundraising and events communication agency
Reiley McClendon (born 1990), American actor
Robert J. Reiley, AIA, (1878–1961), American architect in New York City
Sean Patrick Reiley (born 1976), American writer known for his comedy website
Reiley (singer) (born 1997), Faroese singer

See also
O'Reilly
O'Riley
Reilly (disambiguation)
Reuilly (disambiguation)
Riley (disambiguation)